Wendell Cason (born January 22, 1963) is a former American football cornerback and safety in the National Football League. He was signed by the Atlanta Falcons as an undrafted free agent in 1985. He played college football at Oregon.

Personal
His son, Antoine, played in the NFL as well.

1963 births
Living people
American football safeties
American football cornerbacks
Atlanta Falcons players
Oregon Ducks football players
People from Lakewood, California
Players of American football from California
Sportspeople from Los Angeles County, California